The Nikon FM10 is a manual focus 35 mm film camera sold by Nikon Corporation. It is of SLR design and was first available in 1995. It is normally sold in a kit that includes a Zoom Nikkor 35–70 mm f/3.5-4.8 zoom lens, although a Zoom Nikkor 70–210 mm f/4.5-5.6 zoom lens is also available. An electronic companion model known as the FE10 was also sold at one stage.

The FM10 is not manufactured by Nikon, and is not a true member of the Nikon compact F-series SLRs, as the name implies. It is manufactured by Cosina in Japan (as are both the lenses), and is derived from the Cosina CT-1 chassis.

Following Nikon's decision  to concentrate on digital cameras, the FM10 and the high-end F6 became the sole remaining film SLRs to carry the Nikon name. However, by mid-2022 the FM10 had been marked as "discontinued" across multiple Nikon sites.

The FM10 has a shutter speed range of 1 to 1/2000th second plus bulb and flash X-sync of 1/125th second. Its dimensions are 139 x 86 x 53 mm, and it weighs 420g.  The camera is finished in black with champagne chrome trim.

The FM10 was originally intended for sale in developing Asian markets, but was later sold in Western countries too.

Features

Operation
The FM10 is a mechanically (springs, gears, levers) controlled manual focus SLR with manual exposure control.  It is operable without batteries, which are only required (two S76 or A76, or one 1/3N) for the light metering information system.  This consists of an internal 60/40 percent centerweighted, silicon photodiode light meter linked to a center-the-LED exposure control system using vertically arranged +/•/– light emitting diodes (LEDs) on the left side of the viewfinder to indicate the readings of the meter versus the actual camera settings.  The focusing screen also has 3 mm split image rangefinder and 1 mm microprism collar focusing aids.  Overall, the FM10 has the features of a typical late 1970s SLR.

Lens compatibility
The FM10 accepts any lens with the Nikon F bayonet mount supporting the Aperture Indexing (AI) feature (introduced in 1977), and thus the majority of Nikon lenses manufactured in recent decades. The modern Nikon-made AI lenses are the AF-S Nikkor, AF-I Nikkor, AF Nikkor D and Nikkor AI-S types. The discontinued Nikkor AI and Nikon Series E lenses are also AI types. Many third-party Nikon-mount lenses will also mount and function correctly on the FM10.

Many of the newest Nikon and third-party F-mount lenses, and some older designs, will mount on the FM10, but will not function properly. Nikon’s most recent 35 mm film/full-frame FX digital SLR lenses, the AF Nikkor G type (introduced in 2000) lack an aperture control ring, without which there is no way to set aperture using the FM10. AF Nikkor DX type (2003) lack an aperture ring as well, and have a smaller image circles sized for the smaller sensors on Nikon's DX digital SLRs, thus projecting a black vignette circle onto the FM10 film plane. Nikon's Vibration Reduction (VR) image stabilization system, available on some newer lenses since 2000, does not function on the FM10.

Both IX Nikkor lenses (1996), for Nikon's Advanced Photo System (APS) film SLRs and very old "invasive" Nikkor 35 mm fisheye lenses must not be mounted on the FM10, as their rear elements will intrude far enough into the mirror box to cause damage.

Flash
The Nikon SB-M dedicated flash is designed specifically for the FM10, but it will also accept any other nondedicated hot shoe mounted flash for guide number manual or flash mounted sensor automatic exposure control – the venerable Vivitar 283 (guide number 120, ASA 100/feet; 37, DIN 21/meters) was still available new a quarter century after its introduction in 1975.  The FM10 does not accept a motor drive; film is only advanced manually via a thumb lever.

Design history

Chassis
The aluminum alloy chassis used in the FM10 can be traced back more than twenty-five years to the Cosina CT-1.  Cosina has a long history of producing equipment to specification for other camera companies.  Other famous name SLR cameras that were built around the CT-1 chassis include the Canon T60, Nikon FE10, Olympus OM2000, Ricoh KR-5 Super II and Yashica FX-3.  They differ primarily in their outer cosmetic plastic body panels, lens mounts and nameplates.  This chassis is also used, in heavily reworked form, as the basis for the recent Rollei 35RF, Zeiss Ikon and Cosina's own Voigtländer branded Bessa R series of 35 mm film rangefinder (RF) cameras as well as the unique Epson R-D1 digital rangefinder camera in magnesium alloy.

Target markets and criticism
The Nikon FM10 fills the very bottom of the Nikon SLR line, and was introduced to meet the needs of the burgeoning South and East Asian amateur photographic markets. Until then, Nikon cameras were world-renowned for their very high quality and durability, but were also expensive. Despite the emergence of an increasingly prosperous middle-class in these countries, their income had not yet reached Western standards, so even the cheapest Nikons were generally beyond their means.  The FM10's deliberately limited features and use of relatively dated technology were intended to keep production costs- and therefore price- as low as possible for these markets.

However, the FM10 has been criticised by some for perceived low quality, attributed to its targeting of the brand-conscious nouveau riche in developing countries. It is claimed that the FM10 was intended for those who desired affordable ownership of a famous brand name, regardless of the actual quality of the camera itself.

Nevertheless, when news of the FM10 reached Western photographers, a clamor arose and Nikon decided to offer it worldwide. While there have been mixed opinions, with some expressing reservations about its durability, it has proved popular as an entry level beginner's camera, and for photography students needing or wanting to use film and fully manual, mechanical SLR cameras. The Nikon FM10 sells steadily because of the prominent Nikon brand on its pentaprism, and for its compatibility with a wide range of new and used Nikon and third-party lenses. It is also a fairly popular backup camera among traditionalist photographers using more sophisticated Nikon bodies.

Discontinuation

In January 2006, Nikon announced that they were discontinuing the majority of their film-based camera bodies. Along with Nikon's flagship model, the F6, the FM10 was one of only two to remain in production, lasting until October 2020.

However, by November 2020, Nikon USA had marked the FM10 as "archived" and by mid-2022 it had been marked "discontinued" across multiple Nikon sites.

References

Inline

Other
 "Cosina: And you thought Rodney Dangerfield got no respect!" retrieved 6 January 2009. Archived from the original.
 "Nikon MF/AF Bodies – Lens Compatibility" retrieved 3 January 2006
 Rockwell, Ken. "Nikon Lens Compatibility"  retrieved 4 January 2009
 "Consumers' Mentality: Nikon FM and FE10" retrieved 29 September 2006
 "Reshaping Nikon's Film Camera Assortment" (press release) retrieved 30 September 2006
 Various. Opinions taken from camerareview.com website retrieved 30 September 2006
 Anonymous.  "Yashica's FX-3: Basic, Black, And Beautiful" pp 111–113.  Modern Photography's Photo Buying Guide '85.  reprint from Modern Photography, January 1980.
 Anonymous.  "Camera Test: Olympus OM2000: It's not exactly an OM-1, but …" pp 82–85.  Popular Photography, Volume 62 Number 4; April 1998.
 Anonymous.  "Lens Test: Olympus 35-70 mm f/3.5-4.8: Fine performance in a short zoom" p 92.  Popular Photography, Volume 62 Number 4; April 1998.
 Anonymous.  "Camera Test: Voigtländer Bessa-R: What do you get when you take a pleasant scale-focusing retro 35 and add a multiframe range/viewfinder?  An instant cult classic!" pp 112–115, 164.  Popular Photography, Volume 64 Number 7; July 2000.
 Anonymous.  Nikon: Full Line Product Guide. Volume 8.  Melville, NY: Nikon Inc., 2002
 Keppler, Herbert.  "SLR: Mysterious SLRs that you can't buy"  pp 18.  Popular Photography, Volume 60, Number 3; March 1996.
 Keppler, Herbert.  "Review: Voigtländer Bessa R3A: Frogs Into Princes?  These rangefinders climb the royalty ladder."  pp 58–59.  Popular Photography & Imaging, Volume 69 Number 5; May 2005.
 McNamara, Michael J.  "Test: Epson R-D1: Time Traveler: A 6MP rangefinder for the film purist?  An oxymoron, anyone?"  pp 38–40.  Popular Photography & Imaging, Volume 69 Number 3; March 2005.
 Stafford, Simon and Rudi Hillebrand & Hans-Joachim Hauschild.  The New Nikon Compendium: Cameras, Lenses & Accessories since 1917.  2004 Updated North American Edition. Asheville, NC: Lark Books, 2003.

External links 

FM10
FM10